Acromyrmex balzani is a species of leaf-cutter ant, a New World ant of the subfamily Myrmicinae of the genus Acromyrmex. It is found in the wild naturally in eastern Paraguay and southern Brazil.

Subspecies
Acromyrmex balzani multituber Santschi, 1922

Synonyms 
 Acromyrmex gallardoi Santschi, 1922
 Acromyrmex nivalis Fowler, 1988
 Acromyrmex parens Gonçalves, 1961

See also
List of leafcutter ants

References

External links

Acromyrmex
Insects described in 1890
Hymenoptera of South America